Religious Studies is a peer-reviewed academic journal published by Cambridge University Press. It addresses problems of the philosophy of religion in the context of a variety of religious traditions. Issues were published approximately biannually from the journal's founding in 1965 until 1969, and have been quarterly since 1970.

Abstracting and indexing 
Religious Studies is abstracted and indexed in Arts & Humanities Citation Index, Book Review Index, British Humanities Index, Current Contents/Arts & Humanities, Expanded Academic ASAP, Humanities Abstracts, Humanities International Index, International Bibliography of Periodical Literature, International Bibliography of Book Reviews of Scholarly Literature, MLA International Bibliography, New Testament Abstracts, Philosopher's Index, Rambi (Index of Articles on Jewish Studies), Religion Index One, Guide to Religious Periodicals, and Religious & Theological Abstracts.

Editors 
Editor: Yujin Nagasawa, University of Birmingham, UK.

Book Review Editors:
Tasia Scrutton, University of Leeds, UK
Simon Hewitt, University of Leeds, UK

Emeritus Editors:
Peter Byrne
Robin Le Poidevin
Stewart Sutherland
Keith Ward
Mark Wynn
David Efird

References

External links 
 

Publications established in 1965
Religious studies journals
Philosophy journals
Cambridge University Press academic journals
Quarterly journals
English-language journals